Kevin Evans (born 28 September 1962) is a Canadian Paralympic archer.

He has competed three times at the Summer Paralympics, four times at the World Para Archery Championships, four times at the Continental Championships, and twice at the Para Continental Championships.

Biography
Evans started archery in 1979 and made his international debut in 2004. A gold medallist at the 2011 Parapan American Games and two-time world champion, Evans is one of the world's top Paralympic archers. He lost his left arm in 2000 in a seismic-rig accident in Alberta's Peace River region.

References

External links
 
 

1962 births
Living people
Canadian male archers
Paralympic archers of Canada
Archers at the 2008 Summer Paralympics
Archers at the 2012 Summer Paralympics
Archers at the 2016 Summer Paralympics
Medalists at the 2011 Parapan American Games
Sportspeople from Calgary
21st-century Canadian people